The Evinston Community Store and Post Office (also known as the Fred Wood Store or Wood & Swink) is a historic combined store and post office in Evinston, Florida, United States. It is located on CR 225, north of the Alachua/Marion county border. The address is 18320 Southeast County Road 225. On May 5, 1989, it was added to the U.S. National Register of Historic Places.

See also 
List of United States post offices

References

External links 
 Alachua County listings at National Register of Historic Places
 Alachua County listings at Florida's Office of Cultural and Historical Programs
 List of Florida Historic Places at State of Florida.com
 Alachua County Department of Growth Management
 History of Evinston historic marker
 History of Evinston and virtual tour
 Evinston, Home -- God's Country by Frederick W. Wood (excerpt)
 The Wood and Swink Preservation Society

National Register of Historic Places in Alachua County, Florida